The mayoral election took place in Invercargill, New Zealand, on 22 July 1878.

The incumbent mayor Joseph Hatch was defeated by the former mayor George Lumsden.

Results
The following table gives the election results:

References

1878 elections in New Zealand
Mayoral elections in Invercargill